Casa Diablo may refer to several places:
Casa Diablo, California, in  Sierra Nevada near El Portal along the Merced River
Casa Diablo Hot Springs, California,  in Long Valley Caldera just east of Mammoth Lakes
Casa Diablo Mountain, a mountain at the north end of the Owens Valley in California